The 2019 National Amateur Cup was the 96th edition of the National Amateur Cup, a knockout cup competition open to amateur teams affiliated with the United States Adult Soccer Association (USASA). This was the second edition of the tournament to award a spot in the U.S. Open Cup to its champion.

Newtown Pride FC won their first National Amateur Cup title, defeating Horizon FC 3–0 in the final.

Format
All four regions of the USASA held tournaments to crown champions, which would then qualify for the final tournament. Qualification for these regionals was determined by each one, with USASA Region I, III, and IV awarding spots to the champions of each state or local association's amateur tournament.

The final four teams then compete in a single location knockout tournament to determine a national champion, with an additional game in place to crown both third and fourth place.

Region I

First round

Bracket

Home teams listed on top of bracket

Region II

First round

Bracket

Home teams listed on top of bracket

Region III
Home teams listed on top of bracket

Region IV
Home teams listed on top of bracket

National Amateur Cup Finals
The finals tournament was held between August 2 and 3 on the campus of Triton College in River Grove, Illinois, a suburb of Chicago.

Newtown Pride FC won its first national title, the first by a Connecticut-based club since the Hartford Italian American Stars AC in 1967, along with $15,000 and spots in both the 2020 Hank Steinbrecher Cup and 2020 U.S. Open Cup. Horizon FC took home $10,000 for finishing runner-up while both MesoAmerica FC and RWB Adria earned $7,500 each for finishing third and fourth respectively.

Semifinals

Third place match

National Amateur Cup Final

Notes

References

National Amateur Cup
National Amateur Cup
2019